Xylothamia, the desert goldenrods, is a genus of flowering plants in the family Asteraceae. Until 2003, it was held to contain nine species of shrubs native to deserts of Mexico and the southwestern United States. However, it seems to contain at least two groups.  Four species are related to Gundlachia and may be moved to that genus. Plants of the World Online (part of the Royal Botanic Gardens, Kew) class it as a synonym of Gundlachia. The relationships of the other five species is not quite as clear.  All nine species do belong in the subtribe Solidagininae.

Species 
The following four species, including the type species Xylothamia triantha, are related to each other and to Gundlachia:

Xylothamia diffusa
Xylothamia riskindii
Xylothamia triantha
Xylothamia truncata

Kew lists Gundlachia diffusa Gundlachia triantha and Gundlachia truncata.

The following three species are related to each other and to Bigelowia and Thurovia:

Xylothamia pseudobaccharis
Xylothamia parrasana
Xylothamia purpusii
Due to molecular evidence, these 3 species were transferred to genus Medranoa in 2007; as Medranoa pseudobaccharis, Medranoa parrasana and Medranoa purpusii.

The following two species are related to each other:

Xylothamia johnstonii
Xylothamia palmeri

References

Astereae
Asteraceae genera
Historically recognized angiosperm genera